A forced-air  central heating system is one which uses air as its heat transfer medium. These systems rely on ductwork, vents, and plenums as means of air distribution, separate from the actual heating and air conditioning systems. The return plenum carries the air from several large return grills (vents) to a central air handler for re-heating. The supply plenum directs air from the central unit to the rooms which the system is designed to heat. Regardless of type, all air handlers consist of an air filter, blower, heat exchanger/element/coil, and various controls. Like any other kind of central heating system, thermostats are used to control forced air heating systems.

Forced air heating is the type of central heating most commonly installed in North America. It is much less common in Europe, where hydronic heating predominates, especially in the form of hot-water radiators.

Types

Natural gas/propane/oil/coal/wood
Heat is produced via combustion of fuel.
A heat exchanger keeps the combustion byproducts from entering the air stream.
A ribbon style (long with holes), inshot (torch-like), or oil type burner is located in the heat exchanger.
Ignition is provided by an electric spark, standing pilot, or hot surface igniter.
Safety devices ensure that combustion gases and/or unburned fuel do not accumulate in the event of an ignition failure or venting failure.

Electric
A simple electric heating element warms the air.
When the thermostat calls for heat, blower and element come on at the same time.
When thermostat is "satisfied", blower and element shut off.
Requires very little maintenance.
Usually more expensive to operate than a natural gas furnace.

Heat pump
Extracts heat from the environment, using either the ground or air as the source, via the refrigeration cycle.
Requires less energy than electric resistance heating and possibly more efficient than fossil fuel fired furnaces (gas/oil/coal).
Air source types may not be suitable for cold climates unless used with backup (secondary) source of heat.  Newer models may still provide heat when coping with temperatures below 0 °C (32 °F).
A refrigerant coil is located in the air handler instead of a burner/heat exchanger.  The system can also be used for cooling, just as any central air-conditioning system.
See Heat pumps

Hydronic coil
Combines hydronic (hot water) heating with a forced air delivery
Heat is produced via combustion of fuel (gas/propane/oil) in a boiler
A heat exchanger (hydronic coil) is placed in the air handler similar to the refrigerant coil in a Heat Pump system or a Central AC. Copper is often specified in supply and return manifolds and in tube coils.
Heated water is pumped through the heat exchanger then back to the boiler to be reheated

Sequence of operation 
 Thermostat calls for heat
 Source of ignition is provided at the boiler
 Circulator initiates water flow to the hydronic coil (heat exchanger)
 Once the heat exchanger warms up, the main blower is activated
 When call for heat ceases, the boiler and circulator turn off
 Blower shuts off after period of time (depending on the particular equipment involved this may be a fixed or programmable amount of time)

See also
Forced-air gas
Copper in heat exchangers

References

Heating, ventilation, and air conditioning